Time Actor is the first album by Klaus Schulze released under the name of Richard Wahnfried. It was originally released in 1979, and was not reissued by Revisited Records as part of the overall reissue program of Schulze albums. A reissue was released in July 2011 by Esoteric Records.

Track listing
All tracks composed by 'Wahnfried' or 'Wahnfried/Brown'.

Personnel
 Klaus Schulze – synths
 Arthur Brown – vocals
 Vincent Crane – keyboards
 Wolfgang Tiepold – cello
 Michael Shrieve – percussion

References

External links
 Time Actor at the official site of Klaus Schulze
 

Klaus Schulze albums
Ambient albums by German artists
Trance albums
1979 albums